Esperia is a genus of the concealer moth family (Oecophoridae). Among these, it belongs to subfamily Oecophorinae. Most authors include Dasycera here, though approaches that generally follow a "splitting" approach sometimes do not.

The type species of Esperia (originally described as Tinea orbonella, now E. sulphurella) has some differences versus the type species of Dasycera (originally described as T. aemulella, now E. oliviella), but these are slight and at present it is not determined whether they justify the maintenance of two small genera versus a more comprehensive genus containing two subgenera.

Selected species
Species of Esperia (including Dasycera) include:
 Esperia imitatrix (Zeller, 1847)
 Esperia krueperella (Staudinger, 1871)
 Esperia oliviella
 Esperia sulphurella

Synonyms
Invalid scientific names (junior synonyms and others) of Esperia are:
 Dasycera Stephens 1829 (but see above)
 Dasycerus Haworth 1828 (non Brongniart, 1800: preoccupied)
 Gnaphalodeocera Agassiz, 1847 (unjustified emendation)
 Gnaphalodocera Blanchard, 1840
 Hermiona Blanchard, 1845
 Stenoptera Duponchel, 1838

Footnotes

References
  (2009a): Dasycera. Version 2.1, 2009-DEC-22. Retrieved 2010-APR-27.
  (2009b): Esperia. Version 2.1, 2009-DEC-22. Retrieved 2010-APR-27.
  (2004a): Butterflies and Moths of the World, Generic Names and their Type-species – Dasycera. Version of 2004-NOV-05. Retrieved 2010-APR-27.
  (2004b): Butterflies and Moths of the World, Generic Names and their Type-species – Esperia. Version of 2004-NOV-05. Retrieved 2010-APR-27.
  (2003): Markku Savela's Lepidoptera and some other life forms – Esperia. Version of 2003-DEC-29 Retrieved 2010-APR-27.

Oecophorinae
Moth genera
Taxa named by Jacob Hübner